Martynovo is a rural locality (a village) in Nizhneyerogodskoye Rural Settlement, Velikoustyugsky District, Vologda Oblast, Russia. The population was 5 as of 2002.

Geography 
Martynovo is located 40 km southwest of Veliky Ustyug (the district's administrative centre) by road. Zagorye is the nearest rural locality.

References 

Rural localities in Velikoustyugsky District